Kathleen Mary "Kay" Green (25 September 1927 – 30 November 1997) was a Welsh cricketer who played primarily as a right-arm leg break bowler, as well as an occasional wicket-keeper. She appeared in one Test match in 1954 and two One Day Internationals in 1973 for England. She mainly played domestic cricket for West of England.

Green is the oldest woman cricketer to make debut in Women's ODI history (at the age of 45 years and 292 days).

References

External links
 
 

1927 births
1997 deaths
Cricketers from Swansea
Welsh women cricketers
England women Test cricketers
England women One Day International cricketers
Sussex women cricketers
West women cricketers